Diphenylpropylamine is a propylamine derivative and may refer to:

 2,2-Diphenylpropylamine
 2,3-Diphenylpropylamine
 3,3-Diphenylpropylamine